Zulu Heart is a 2003 alternate history novel by Steven Barnes, a sequel to the 2002 book, Lion's Blood.

Plot
Zulu Heart is set in an alternate world where an Islamic Africa became the dominant world power and Europe remained primitive. It continues the story of a young African nobleman, Kai ibn Jallaleddin ibn Rashid al Kushi, and his former slave, the Irishman Aidan O'Dere.

References 

2003 science fiction novels
2003 American novels
American alternate history novels
American science fiction novels